In linguistics, the syntax–semantics interface is the interaction between syntax and semantics. Its study encompasses phenomena that pertain to both syntax and semantics, with the goal of explaining correlations between form and meaning. Specific topics include scope, binding, and lexical semantic properties such as verbal aspect and nominal individuation, semantic macroroles, and unaccusativity.

The interface is conceived of very differently in formalist and functionalist approaches. While functionalists tend to look into semantics and pragmatics for explanations of syntactic phenomena, formalists try to limit such explanations within syntax itself. It is sometimes referred to as the morphosyntax–semantics interface or the syntax-lexical semantics interface.

Functionalist approaches 

Within functionalist approaches, research on the syntax–semantics interface has been aimed at disproving the formalist argument of the autonomy of syntax, by finding instances of semantically determined syntactic structures.

Levin and Rappaport Hovav, in their 1995 monograph, reiterated that there are some aspects of verb meaning that are relevant to syntax, and others that are not, as previously noted by Steven Pinker. Levin and Rappaport Hovav isolated such aspects focusing on the phenomenon of unaccusativity that is "semantically determined and syntactivally encoded".

Van Valin and LaPolla, in their 1997 monographic study, found that the more semantically motivated or driven a syntactic phenomena is, the more it tends to be typologically universal, that is, to show less cross-linguistic variation.

Formal approaches  

In formal semantics, semantic interpretation is viewed as a mapping from syntactic structures to denotations. There are several formal views of the syntax-semantics interface which differ in what they take to be the inputs and outputs of this mapping. In the Heim and Kratzer model commonly adopted within generative linguistics, the input is taken to be a special level of syntactic representation called logical form. At logical form, semantic relationships such as scope and binding are represented unambiguously, having been determined by syntactic operations such as quantifier raising. Other formal frameworks take the opposite approach, assuming that such relationships are established by the rules of semantic interpretation themselves. In such systems, the rules include mechanisms such as type shifting and dynamic binding.

History 
Before the 1950s, there was no discussion of a syntax–semantics interface in American linguistics, since neither syntax nor semantics was an active area of research. This neglect was due in part to the influence of logical positivism and behaviorism in psychology, that viewed hypotheses about linguistic meaning as untestable.

By the 1960s, syntax had become a major area of study, and some researchers began examining semantics as well. In this period, the most prominent view of the interface was the Katz-Postal Hypothesis according to which deep structure was the level of syntactic representation which underwent semantic interpretation. This assumption was upended by data involving quantifiers, which showed that syntactic transformations can affect meaning. During the linguistics wars, a variety of competing notions of the interface were developed, many of which live on in present day work.

See also 

 Active–stative alignment
 Antecedent-contained deletion
 Coercion (linguistics)
 Colorless green ideas sleep furiously
 Compositionality
 David Dowty
 Form-meaning mismatch
 Morphosyntactic alignment
 Role and reference grammar
 Selection (linguistics)
 Semantic class
 Semantic feature
 Semantic primes
 Semantic property
 Shifting (syntax)
 Split intransitivity
 Thematic relation
 Type shifter

Notes

References 
 
 Chierchia, G. (1999) Syntax-semantics interface, pp. 824-826, in: The MIT Encyclopedia of the Cognitive Sciences, Edited by Keil & Wilson (1999) Cambridge, MA: The MIT Press.
 Hackl, M. (2013) The syntax–semantics interface. Lingua, 130, 66-87.
 
 Levin, B., & Pinker, S. (1992) Introduction in  Beth Levin & Steven Pinker (1992, Eds) Lexical & conceptual semantics. (A Cognition Special Issue) Cambridge, MA and Oxford: Blackwell, 1991. Pp. 244.
 Levin, B., & Rappaport Hovav, M. (1995). Unaccusativity: At the syntax–lexical semantics interface. Cambridge, MA: MIT Press
  
 Pinker, S. (1989) Learnability and cognition: The acquisition of argument structure. New editoin in 2013: Learnability and Cognition, new edition: The Acquisition of Argument Structure. MIT press.
 Taylor, J. (2017) Lexical Semantics. In B. Dancygier (Ed.), The Cambridge Handbook of Cognitive Linguistics (Cambridge Handbooks in Language and Linguistics, pp. 246-261). Cambridge: Cambridge University Press. 
 Tenny, C. (1994). Aspectual roles and the syntax-semantics interface (Vol. 52). Dordrecht: Kluwer.
 Van Valin, R. D. Jr. & LaPolla, R. J. (1997)  Syntax: Structure, meaning, and function. Cambridge University Press.
 Van Valin Jr, R. D. (2003) Functional linguistics, ch. 13 in The handbook of linguistics, pp. 319-336.
 Van Valin, R. D. Jr. (2005). Exploring the syntax-semantics interface,  Cambridge University Press.
 Vendler, Z. (1957) Verbs and times  in The Philosophical Review 66(2): 143–160. Reprinted as ch. 4 of Linguistics and Philosophy, Ithaca, NY: Cornell University Press 1967, pp.97-121.

Further reading 
 Jackendoff, R., Levin, B., & Pinker, S. (1991). Lexical and conceptual semantics.
 Jackendoff, R. (1997). The architecture of the language faculty (No. 28). MIT Press.
 
 
 Wechsler, S. (2020) The Role of the Lexicon in the Syntax–Semantics Interface. Annual Review of Linguistics, 6, 67-87.
 Yi, E., & Koenig, J. P. (2016) Why verb meaning matters to syntax, in Fleischhauer, J., Latrouite, A., & Osswald, R. (2016) Explorations of the syntax-semantics interface (pp. 57-76). düsseldorf university press.

Syntax–semantics interface
Semantics
Syntax
Generative syntax
Formal semantics (natural language)